Ronald Maurice Bean, better known professionally as Mathematics (also known as Allah Mathematics) (born October 21, 1971), is a hip hop producer and DJ for the Wu-Tang Clan and its solo and affiliate projects. He designed the Wu-Tang Clan logo.

Biography
Born and raised in Jamaica, Queens, New York, Mathematics was introduced to hip hop by his brother who used to bring home recordings of the genre's pioneers like Grandmaster Flash & The Furious Five, Treacherous Three and Cold Crush Brothers. He began his career in 1987 DJing block parties and park jams in Baisley Projects, going by the name Supreme Cut Master. In 1988, he became the full-time DJ for experienced rapper Victor C, doing countless shows in clubs and colleges in New York City.

In 1990, Mathematics linked up with GZA/Genius, who would soon become one of the Wu-Tang Clan's founding members, but at the time was struggling to build a career on the Cold Chillin' label. This partnership earned Mathematics a spot on his first official tour, The Cold Chillin Blizzard Tour (with popular acts such as Biz Markie, Big Daddy Kane, Kool G. Rap & DJ Polo and Marley Marl).

GZA left Cold Chillin after his first album, Words from the Genius, did not achieve the sales target that was anticipated. He and Mathematics took to the road again, but this time with the help of GZA's cousins, RZA and Ol' Dirty Bastard. These three soon became the founding members of Wu-Tang Clan, then known as All In Together Now. The group soon dissolved, however, and the trio set their minds on creating the Wu group. During the group's inception, Mathematics used his experience as a graffiti artist to design a logo for the up-and-coming crew, as well as various other logos and designs the Wu-Tang's artists would use. In the years to come, he became a Wu-Element under the guidance of RZA.

Mathematics' first real exposure to production came late one night when he attended a session where he assisted RZA, his mentor, in constructing a beat from nothing. The track eventually developed into "Ice Cream" on Raekwon's Only Built 4 Cuban Linx album. RZA inspired Mathematics to follow the Wu-Tang, giving him advice on the nuances of hip hop production over the coming years. In 1996, Mathematics began record producing, in Staten Island, New York (Shaolin) and at home, in the P-Funk City, Plainfield, New Jersey, between heavily scheduled tour dates and rigorous road travelling with his father's gospel group, The Soul Seekers.

His first track, "Fast Life" featuring Ghostface Killah and the American football star Andre Rison, was included in the NFL Jams compilation album. Though this track faded into obscurity somewhat, it led to several more collaborations between Mathematics and Ghostface; Mathematics also began to produce for many other Wu-Tang members and affiliates, including several tracks on GZA's second album Beneath The Surface as well as Method Man's Tical 2000: Judgement Day, Inspectah Deck's Uncontrolled Substance and Method Man & Redman's Blackout!. Eventually, he produced for the Clan as a group, with "Do You Really (Thang, Thang)", "Careful (Click, Click)".

In 2003, Mathematics moved into TV work, as he produced the main theme and all original music for the short lived show Wanda At Large, which starred Wanda Sykes and was broadcast by the Fox Network. During this time and between continuous touring, Mathematics started work on his first solo full length project, Love, Hell Or Right. Completely mixed, arranged and produced by himself, Love Hell or Right was released fall 2003 on his own Quewisha Records label in conjunction with High Times Records, and it went on to sell 30,000 units.

As well as using rappers from Mathematics' home borough of Queens, Eyes-Low and Buddah Bless, Love Hell Or Right had appearances from all the Wu-Tang Clan members except GZA and the then-imprisoned Ol' Dirty Bastard. Mathematics soon signed to the popular independent hip hop label Nature Sounds (home to Wu-Tang colleague Masta Killa as well as MF DOOM) and released his second album The Problem in 2005. On this album the entire Wu-Tang Clan appeared, including a posthumous appearance from Ol' Dirty Bastard. As well as working on his solo albums, Mathematics has continued to contribute beats to many Wu-Tang releases, including the first albums by Masta Killa and Streetlife. In January 2012 he was to release a sequel to The Problem entitled The Answer, entirely produced by him with Wu-Tang members such as Raekwon, GZA, Method Man, Cappadonna, Masta Killa, Ol' Dirty Bastard, Ghostface Killah. Other artists include Redman and artists he is developing such as Ali Vegas, Eyeslow and Bad Luck.

In August 2017, it was confirmed that Wu-Tang Clan will release a new album, Wu-Tang: The Saga Continues, which was entirely produced by Mathematics and was released on October 13, 2017. The first track off the album is titled "People Say" and features Redman.

Discography

Albums

Production credits
America Is Dying Slowly - Red Hot AIDS Benefit Series, Red Hot Organization, Smoke One Productions
NFL Jams - "Fast Life"
Wu-Syndicate - "Pointin' Fingers", "Muzzle Toe"
Dirty Weaponry - "Galactics", "Bastard Swordsman"
Wu-Tang Killa Bees: The Swarm - "Cobra Clutch", "Punishment", "Fatal Sting"
The Pillage - "Oh Donna"
Tical 2000 Judgement Day - "Snuffed Out"
Beneath the Surface - "Amplified Sample", "High Price Small Reward", "Publicity", "Feel Like An Enemy", "Mic Trippin’"
Uncontrolled Substance - "Uncontrolled Substance"
Blackout! - "Dat's Dat Shit", "Fire Ina Hole"
The W - "Do You Really (Thang Thang)"
Supreme Clientele - "Mighty Healthy", "Wu-Banga 101"
Iron Flag - "Rules"
Digital Bullet - "Must Be Bobby", "Cousins"
Next Friday - "Shaolin Worldwide"
Bulletproof Wallets - "Theodore", "Strawberry"
 Legend of the Liquid Sword - "Fam (Members Only)"
Tera Iz Him - "Roll With The Rush"
Northstar - "Duckie", "We Got It"
No Said Date - "Last Drink", "Do That Dance", "Whatever"
Street Education - "FANZ", "Who Want To Rap?", "Sweetest Pain"
Wu-Tang Meets the Indie Culture - "Cars On the Interstate"
4:21...The Day After - "Dirty Mef", "Everything"
I - "Two Missed Calls"
8 Diagrams - "Stick Me for My Riches"
Pro Tools - "Pencil"
Blackout! 2 - "BO2 (Intro)"
Only Built 4 Cuban Linx... Pt. II - "Mean Streets"
Wu-Massacre - "Meth vs. Chef Part II", "Miranda", "Dangerous"
Heaven Razah - "Raised In Hell"
Shaolin vs. Wu-Tang - "Dart School"
Gold Cobra - "Middle Finger", "Combat Jazz"
Selling My Soul - "Intro", "Part 2", "All Natural" & "Wisdom"
The Saga Continues - entire album

References

External links
Mathematics on Myspace
Mathematics discography

Living people
African-American record producers
American hip hop record producers
American hip hop DJs
Five percenters
Musicians from Queens, New York
People from Jamaica, Queens
Wu-Tang Clan affiliates
1972 births
East Coast hip hop musicians
Record producers from New York (state)